The Série 1300 were a class of diesel locomotives used by Portuguese Railways (CP). They entered service in 1952; all are now withdrawn from service.

These diesel-electric locomotives were manufactured in the US by the Whitcomb Locomotive Company in 1952, to the constructor's model 104DE2. They had a central cab and an A1A-A1A bogie designation. Electrical equipment was provided by the Westinghouse Electric Corporation. They were withdrawn from service in 1987. Although they were somewhat similar to the older ALCO-built Série 1500, difficulties in purchasing spare parts for these locomotives hastened their withdrawal.

Railway locomotives introduced in 1952
A1A-A1A locomotives
Diesel-electric locomotives of Portugal